The Nelson-Marlborough Regional Council was one of 13 regional councils established through the passing of the Local Government Act 1987. The council was established in the 1989 local government reforms, but disestablished only three years later in 1992, when its functions went to the unitary authorities of Nelson City Council, Tasman District Council, and Marlborough District Council. Kaikoura District had belonged to the Nelson-Marlborough Regional Council but with the 1992 reform was transferred to the Canterbury Regional Council.

References

Regional councils of New Zealand
Tasman District
Marlborough Region
Politics of the Nelson Region